The National Register of Cultural Monuments (Estonian language: Kultuurimälestiste riiklik register) is the Estonian government's official list of "cultural monuments", including buildings, sites and objects. It is maintained by the National Heritage Board of Estonia.

References

External links

Government of Estonia
Cultural heritage of Estonia
Databases in Estonia